Naira Melkumian was the Foreign Minister of the Nagorno Karabakh Republic (NKR) from 1997 until 2002.

References

External links
Naira Melkumian, Arkady Gukasian

Politicians from the Republic of Artsakh